Anolis soinii is a species of lizard in the family Dactyloidae. The species is found in Peru and Ecuador.

References

Anoles
Reptiles described in 2008
Reptiles of Peru
Reptiles of Ecuador